Aspengrove School is a pre-school to grade 12 school in Nanaimo, British Columbia, Canada. The school is an independent, non-denominational, co-educational, and university-preparatory school.
Aspengrove has three houses: Oak, Cedar, and Arbutus.

History
Aspengrove School was founded in 2003 and was originally located at 6553 Portsmouth Road in Nanaimo.
At the time of its grand opening 42 students and 8 faculty occupied the  lot. The first principal was Cathy Grunlund. Over the summer of 2006 the school relocated and currently operates on a  parcel. There are approximately 310 enrolled students and 50 faculty offering instruction from Jr. Kindergarten for 3-year-olds to Grade 12. The school is accredited as an International Baccalaureate World School and offers the IB Primary Years, IB Middle Years and IB Diploma programme and received a 10 out of 10 by the IB Organization (IBO) in 2011. Aspengrove is currently 19 years old.

Events
Aspengrove School has many events, like the trips to Tribune Bay, Strathcona or Bamfield. There are many open houses and field trips for all ages.

References

External links

Boarding schools in British Columbia
High schools in British Columbia
Elementary schools in British Columbia
International Baccalaureate schools in British Columbia
Private schools in British Columbia
Educational institutions established in 2003
2003 establishments in British Columbia